The Canadian Owners and Pilots Association (COPA) is a federally registered not-for-profit association that provides information and advocacy services for Canadian pilots who fly for non-commercial purposes.

COPA has close to 15,000 members which ranks it as the largest aviation association of any kind in Canada.  Its mission is to "Advance, promote and preserve the Canadian freedom to fly". Its members represent about 50% of all private and commercial pilots in the country.

History
COPA was formed in 1952 by Ottawa aviators Margaret Carson and John Bogie. They saw the need for an organization to represent the interests of private pilots to the government of Canada. Their model was the US-based Aircraft Owners and Pilots Association (AOPA) which had been formed 13 years earlier in 1939. After meeting with AOPA principals and receiving encouragement from them, COPA was set up with headquarters in Carson's garage. As the association grew, they hired their first paid employees and moved into more permanent offices. Bogie became the association's first president and today continues to serve as an honorary director.

COPA was a founding member of the International Council of Aircraft Owner and Pilot Associations (IAOPA) and remains an active participant in this international body.

Organization

COPA is governed by a 15-member board of directors who are elected by the members of the association on a regional basis. They serve four-year terms, with elections held in even-numbered years. Board meetings are held three times a year.

COPA has a staff of six who work from the association's offices in Ottawa.

Today
Until May 2016, COPA published a monthly tabloid-format newspaper.  Since June 2016, it is full colour magazine still named COPA Flight.  The first edition featured Chris Hadfield (ret. Canadian Astronaut) as the new voice and spokesperson for COPA. It also runs a unique aircraft group insurance program. The insurance program, administered by Marsh Canada Limited until August 2011 is now run by the Magnes Group.

The association also has a large website, with some sections available to members only. The website includes its COPA Guides. These fifteen books provide information to members on such subjects as buying an aircraft, creating your own aerodrome and dealing with government regulatory enforcement action. There are also guides on each category of aircraft in Canada from ultralights to certified aircraft. The association has an on-line user-editable public airport directory called Places to Fly. COPA also provides technical assistance to its members on aviation questions and problems.

COPA is a registered lobbying organization and conducts advocacy work on behalf of aircraft owners with Transport Canada, Nav Canada and other governmental agencies. The association is a member of each of the Canadian Aviation Regulation Advisory Council's (CARAC) nine technical committees. COPA has a large Special Action Fund renamed the Freedom to Fly Fund collected from its members over the years, which is often used to fund court cases.

The association has a network of 207 local chapters across the country. These COPA Flights annually run many local aviation events, including many of Canada's summertime fly-ins.

COPA holds an annual general meeting and two conventions, one in Western and one in Eastern Canada.

Youth flying programs
COPA was the Canadian partner in the Experimental Aircraft Association's Young Eagles program between 1992 and 2008. Young Eagles was started in 1992 with the goal of flying more than 1,000,000 young people between ages 8 and 17 by the December 2003 100th anniversary of the Wright Brothers first flight. The goal was met with COPA's members flying about 10% of the total Young Eagles flown in the world. COPA's participation in the program was terminated on 31 May 2008, due to insurance issues.

COPA introduced a replacement program, under the name COPA For Kids Aviation Program on 11 February 2009. Then COPA President Kevin Psutka stated:

References

External links
 

Aviation organizations based in Canada
Organizations based in Ottawa
Lobbying organizations in Canada
1952 establishments in Canada